The Masquerade (stylized in all lowercase) is the debut studio album by indie pop singer-songwriter Mxmtoon, self-released on September 17, 2019. The album was primarily produced by Cavetown and co-produced by Mxmtoon. "Prom Dress", "High & Dry", "Seasonal Depression", "Blame Game" and "Dream of You" were released as singles.

Background 
Prior to the album's release, Spotify announced the release of 21 Days, a music podcast which followed Mxmtoon and Cavetown as they worked on the album in New York City. When asked to describe the album with three words in an interview with Urban Outfitters, Mxmtoon described the album as "sad", "evolved" and "universal". The album was recorded at Shifted Recording Studio in Brooklyn.

Critical reception 

Joshua Bote of Paste described the ten-track album as "comforting twee-pop that wrings out genuine pathos from Mxmtoon's internet celebrity." Matt Yuyitung of Exclaim! wrote "[Maia] brings her wry sense of humour and diary-entry lyricism to her debut record, recalling the lo-fi relatability of Frankie Cosmos." NPR's All Songs Considered wrote the album "straddles whimsy and earnest depth."

Track listing 

Notes
 All track titles are stylized in all lowercase.

Personnel 
Credits adapted from Tidal.
 Mxmtoon – vocals (all tracks), additional producer, music publisher
 Robin Skinner – producer (all tracks)

Charts

References 

2019 debut albums
Mxmtoon albums